Robin Stenuit (born 16 June 1990 in Louvain-la-Neuve) is a Belgian cyclist, who most recently rode for French amateur team V.C. Amateur Saint Quentin.

Major results

2011
 2nd ZLM Tour
 8th Beverbeek Classic
2012
 6th De Vlaamse Pijl
2013
 1st Omloop van Grensstreek
 9th Grote 1-MeiPrijs
2014
 2nd De Kustpijl
2015
 1st Schaal Sels
 1st Grand Prix de la ville de Nogent-sur-Oise
 1st Memorial Van Coningsloo
 3rd Overall Tour de Gironde
1st Stage 1
 6th Ronde van Limburg
 10th De Kustpijl
2016
 8th Grand Prix Impanis-Van Petegem
 9th Münsterland Giro
2017
 4th Nationale Sluitingsprijs
 7th Tacx Pro Classic
2018
 10th Grand Prix Albert Fauville-Baulet
2019
 3rd Grand Prix de la ville de Pérenchies

References

External links

 
 

1990 births
Living people
Belgian male cyclists
People from Ottignies-Louvain-la-Neuve
Cyclists from Walloon Brabant
21st-century Belgian people